The organistrum is an early form of hurdy-gurdy. Generally considered the ancestor of all subsequent hurdy-gurdies, the organistrum differs substantially from later instruments in that it was played by two individuals: one turned the crank while the other pulled the keys upward to change the musical pitch of the melody strings.

Origins
The word organistrum is derived from organum and instrumentum; the former term was applied to the primitive harmonies, consisting of octaves accompanied by fourths or fifths, first practised by Hucbald in the 10th century. This explanation enables us to fix with tolerable certainty the date of the invention of the organistrum, at the end of the 10th or beginning of the 11th century, and also to understand the construction of the instrument. A stringed instrument of the period — such as a guitar fiddle, a rotta or oval vielle — being used as model, the proportions were increased for the convenience of holding the instrument and of dividing the performance between two persons. Inside the body was the wheel, having a tire of leather well rosined, and working easily through an aperture in the soundboard. The three strings resting on the wheel and supported besides on a bridge of the same height all sounded at once as the wheel revolved, and in the earliest examples the wooden tangents taking the place of fingers on the frets of the neck acted upon all three strings at once, thus producing the harmony known as organum.

Organistrum in art

The organistrum appears on a bas-relief from the abbey of St Georges de Boscherville (11th century), now preserved in the museum of Rouen, where it is played by a royal lady, her maid turning the crank. It has the place of honour in the centre of the band of musicians representing the twenty-four elders of the Apocalypse in the tympanum of the Gate of Glory of the cathedral of Santiago de Compostela (12th century). There is also a fine example in a miniature of a psalter of English workmanship (12th century), forming part of the Hunterian collection in Glasgow University; this was shown at the Exhibition of Illuminated MSS. at the Burlington Fine Arts Club in 1908.

References

Early musical instruments
Hurdy-gurdies